This is a list of episodes for The Daily Show in 2015. This is the final year of The Daily Show to be hosted by Jon Stewart, whose final episode was on August 6, 2015. This is also the first year of The Daily Show to be hosted by Trevor Noah, whose first episode was on September 28, 2015.

On February 10, 2015, Stewart announced that he would resign at a later time in the year. Stewart's hour-plus-long final episode on August 6 featured reunions with former Daily Show correspondents and cameo video clips from people Stewart had targeted over the years including Bill O'Reilly, John McCain, Chris Christie, and Hillary Clinton. It concluded with a performance by Bruce Springsteen and the E Street Band.

On March 30, 2015, Comedy Central announced that Trevor Noah will become the host of The Daily Show following the departure of Stewart. Noah's half hour-plus-long first episode on September 28 was simulcast by Viacom on Nick-at-Nite, Spike, MTV, MTV2, mtvU, VH1, VH1 Classic, BET, Centric, CMT, TV Land, and Logo TV.

2015 (under Stewart)

January

February

March

April

May

June

July

August

2015 (under Noah)

September

October

November

December

References

 
Daily Show guests
Daily Show guests